Cavin Riley Ridley (born July 21, 1996) is an American football wide receiver who is a free agent. He played college football at Georgia.

Early years
Ridley attended Deerfield Beach High School in Deerfield Beach, Florida. He was a four-star wide receiver coming out of high school with over 13 offers, including those from Georgia, Alabama, and Auburn. Ultimately, Ridley committed to the University of Georgia to play college football.

College career
Ridley played in 11 games as a true freshman at Georgia in 2016, catching 12 passes for 238 yards and two touchdowns. As a sophomore in 2017, he had 14 receptions for 218 yards and two touchdowns. As a junior in 2018, Ridley had 43 receptions for 559 yards and nine touchdowns. After the season, he decided to forgo his senior year and enter the 2019 NFL Draft.

Professional career

Ridley was drafted by the Chicago Bears in the fourth round (126th overall) of the 2019 NFL Draft. He signed his rookie contract, worth $3.2 million over 4 years with a $682.5k signing bonus, on May 13.

During his rookie year, Ridley was active for just one of the first eleven games of the 2019 season: a Week 4 against the Minnesota Vikings. Due to injuries to the wide receiver corps, he began seeing increased action starting in Week 13 against the Detroit Lions, and caught his first career pass the following week against the Dallas Cowboys. 

He was waived during the Bears final cuts on August 31, 2021.

Personal life
His brother, Calvin Ridley, also plays wide receiver in the NFL for the Jacksonville Jaguars.

References

External links
Georgia Bulldogs bio

1996 births
Living people
Ridley, Riley
People from Coconut Creek, Florida
Players of American football from Florida
Sportspeople from Broward County, Florida
American football wide receivers
Georgia Bulldogs football players
Chicago Bears players